Pseudonocardia sediminis is a Gram-positive and aerobic bacterium from the genus of Pseudonocardia which has been isolated from marine sediments from the South China Sea.

References

Pseudonocardia
Bacteria described in 2014